Samuel Leeper Devine (December 21, 1915 – June 27, 1997) was an American politician of the Republican Party who served in the United States House of Representatives as Representative of the 12th congressional district of Ohio from January 3, 1959 until January 3, 1981; he left office after being defeated by Democrat Bob Shamansky, who lost the seat after a single term to Republican John Kasich. During the 96th Congress, he was the Chairman of the House Republican Conference.

Early life

Samuel L. Devine was born in South Bend, Indiana, on December 21, 1915 and his family moved to Columbus, Ohio, in 1920. He attended Upper Arlington High School. Devine attended Colgate University from 1933 to 1934 and the Ohio State University from 1934 to 1937. After graduating from OSU, Devine went to law school at the University of Notre Dame (located in the city of his birth) and received an LL.B. and J.D. in 1940.

Career 
Devine was admitted to the bar in 1940 and began private legal practice in Columbus, but in 1940 was appointed a special agent of the Federal Bureau of Investigation. He resigned from the Bureau in October 1945 and resumed private practice in Columbus.

Devine embarked on a political career in 1950 and was elected to the Ohio House of Representatives, where he served from 1951 to 1955. Devine was chairman of the Ohio Un-American Activities Committee, a joint committee of the Ohio House and the Senate modelled on the federal House Un-American Activities Committee. This committee, given extensive powers of interrogation, declared in 1952 that approximately 1,300 Ohioans were members of the Communist Party. At Devine's urging, the state legislature overrode a gubernatorial veto of a bill to impose prison terms and fines on Communists.

Devine served as Prosecuting Attorney for Franklin County, Ohio, from 1955 until 1958, when he was elected to the United States Congress.

Devine was also a college football official for 27 years.

Death and legacy 

He died on June 27, 1997 from cancer in Upper Arlington, Ohio.

His daughter, Carol Miller, is a former Republican member of the West Virginia House of Delegates, where she served as majority whip. In 2018, Miller was elected to Congress from West Virginia's 3rd congressional district over Democrat Richard Ojeda in one of the most-watched races in the country.

References

External links

|-

|-

1915 births
1997 deaths
20th-century American politicians
Colgate University alumni
County district attorneys in Ohio
Federal Bureau of Investigation agents
Republican Party members of the Ohio House of Representatives
Notre Dame Law School alumni
Ohio State University alumni
Politicians from Columbus, Ohio
Republican Party members of the United States House of Representatives from Ohio